Data rooms are spaces used for housing data, usually of a secure or privileged nature. They can be physical data rooms, virtual data rooms, or data centers. They are used for a variety of purposes, including data storage, document exchange, file sharing, financial transactions, legal transactions, and more.

In mergers and acquisitions, the traditional data room will genuinely be a physically secured and continually monitored room, normally in the vendor’s offices (or those of their lawyers), which the bidders and their advisers will visit in order to inspect and report on the various documents and other data made available. Often only one bidder at a time will be allowed to enter and if new documents or new versions of documents are required these will have to be brought in by courier as hardcopy. Teams involved in large due diligence processes will typically have to be flown in from many regions or countries and remain available throughout the process.  Such teams often comprise a number of experts in different fields and so the overall cost of keeping such groups on call near to the data room is often extremely high.  Combating the significant cost of physical data rooms is the virtual data room, which provides for the secure, online dissemination of confidential information. 

A virtual data room (VDR) is essentially a website with limited controlled access (using a secure log-on supplied by the vendor/authority which can be disabled at any time by the vendor/authority if a bidder withdraws) to which the bidders and their advisers are given access. Much of the information released will be confidential and restrictions should be applied to the viewers' ability to release this to third parties by forwarding, copying or printing. Digital rights management is sometimes applied to control information.

With annual growth of about 16% for last seven years virtual data room market forecast is $1.6 Billion.  Detailed auditing must be provided for legal reasons so that a record is kept of who has seen which version of each document.

Data rooms are commonly used by legal, accounting, investment banking and private equity companies performing mergers and acquisitions, fundraising, insolvency, corporate restructuring, and joint ventures including biotechnology and tender processes.

References

Data management
Rooms